Ratting may refer to:

 Rat-catcher, the profession of catching rats
 Rat-baiting, the bloodsport of dogs catching rats
 Informant, telling on people
 Backcombing, a method of styling hair to add volume
 Leecher (computing), alternative term usually used in video games
 The use of a remote access trojan for malicious purposes